Johannes Nordström (born 23 January 1993) is a Finnish footballer, currently playing as a defender at FC Åland. He hails from Åland, an autonomous region of Finland, but was born in Örebro, Sweden.

Career 
Nordström played his first league match for IFK Mariehamn away at MYPA in October 2010. Even though he's primarily known as a central defender, he played the position of full back for 90 minutes in this match.

In January 2011, Nordström was a part of the U-18 team of Finland that drew with Russia and beat Italy 3–0 in an international tournament. Nordström was chosen to be team captain, and featured in both matches for 90 minutes as a central defender. He also played in the final, where Finland managed to beat China 2–0.

References

External links
Player profile 

1993 births
Living people
Sportspeople from Åland
Finnish footballers
IFK Mariehamn players
Veikkausliiga players
Swedish-speaking Finns
Eskilstuna City FK players
FC Åland players
Boo FK players
Association football central defenders